Bafra Shooting Range, also known as Şehit Mustafa Serin Shooting Range,  ( or Şehit Mustafa Serin Atış Poligonu) is an indoor shooting range located in Bafra district of Samsun Province, northern Turkey.  It was built for the 2017 Summer Deaflympics.

The tender for the construction of the building was announced on November 16, 2016. Built by the local agency of the Ministry of Youth and Sports, it is situated in Fatih Mah., Sedde Yolu 2. Sok. in Bafra. It was opened in June 2017, and named in honor of Mustafa Serin, an officer of the Police Special Operation Department in Ankara, who was killed in the line of duty, ( for martyr) during the 2016 Turkish coup d'état attempt. The shooting venue has a seating capacity for 500 spectators.

International events hosted
The venue will host shooting events of the 2017 Summer Deaflympics.

References

Sports venues in Samsun
Indoor arenas in Turkey
Shooting ranges in Turkey
Sports venues completed in 2017
2017 establishments in Turkey
Bafra